Franjo Vladić (born 19 October 1950) is a Bosnian former international football player who played as a midfielder and a manager.

Club career
Vladić began his club career with the then-largest regional side in Herzegovina, Velež Mostar, where he played for a decade and excelled in midfield. Vladić played in over 300 league games for Velež and scored over 70 goals and is remembered for being the part of the Velež three known as the "Mostar BMV" (Bajević, Marić and Vladić) during the 1960s, 70s and 80s. In the summer of 1979 he was proposed by the then player of AEK Athens Bajević to the people of club and they proceeded to acquire him. With AEK, he played only 21 times without being able to convince with his performance. In the summer of 1981, he returned to Yugoslavia and played for a year with Partizan, making 33 appearances, while in 1982 he returned to Velež, where he ended his football career after three years.

International career
Vladić made his debut for Yugoslavia in an October 1972 friendly match away against England and made 26 appearances and scored 3 goals at the international level, competing in the 1974 FIFA World Cup and the UEFA Euro 1976. His final international was a February 1977 friendly match against Mexico.

Managerial career
In the summer of 1995, Vladić became the new manager of Velež's fierce city rivals Zrinjski Mostar, who he led for one season until leaving the club in the summer of 1996.

References

External links

 Serbian national football team website

1950 births
Living people
Sportspeople from Mostar
Association football midfielders
Bosnia and Herzegovina footballers
Yugoslav footballers
Yugoslavia international footballers
1974 FIFA World Cup players
UEFA Euro 1976 players
FK Velež Mostar players
AEK Athens F.C. players
Panachaiki F.C. players
FK Partizan players
Yugoslav First League players
Super League Greece players
Yugoslav expatriate footballers
Expatriate footballers in Greece
Yugoslav expatriate sportspeople in Greece
Bosnia and Herzegovina football managers
HŠK Zrinjski managers